The following is a list of presidents of Angola since the establishment of the office in 1975. The current president is João Lourenço, who assumed the office on 26 September 2017.

Presidents of Angola

Timeline

References

Sources 
 http://www.rulers.org/rula2.html#angola
 http://www.worldstatesmen.org/Angola.html
 African States and Rulers, John Stewart, McFarland
 Guinness Book of Kings, Rulers & Statesmen, Clive Carpenter, Guinness Superlatives Ltd
 Heads of State and Government, 2nd Edition, John V da Graca, MacMillan Press 2000

See also 
 Vice President of Angola
 Prime Minister of Angola

Relevant lists 
 Angola
 List of prime ministers of Angola
 List of Ngolas of Ndongo
 List of heads of state of Democratic People's Republic of Angola
 List of heads of government of Democratic People's Republic of Angola
 List of colonial governors of Angola

 General
 Lists of office-holders
 List of current heads of state and government

Angola, List of Presidents of
 
Presidents
1975 establishments in Angola
Presidents
Presidents